Ridgeville is a town in Dorchester County, South Carolina, United States. The population was 1,979 at the 2010 census, up from 1,690 at the 2000 census. Ridgeville is part of the Charleston-North Charleston-Summerville metropolitan area.

History
The Cypress Methodist Camp Ground was added to the National Register of Historic Places in 1978.

Geography
Ridgeville is located near the center of Dorchester County at  (33.0931, -80.3124).

The town limits extend east to include Lieber Correctional Institution, run by the South Carolina Department of Corrections.

Demographics

As of the census of 2000, there were 1,690 people, 214 households, and 156 families residing in the town. The population density was 930.4 people per square mile (358.5/km2). There were 232 housing units at an average density of 127.7 per square mile (49.2/km2). The racial makeup of the town was 39.94% White, 58.70% African American, 0.59% Native American, 0.30% from other races, and 0.47% from two or more races. Hispanic or Latino of any race were 0.47% of the population.

There were 214 households, out of which 30.8% had children under the age of 18 living with them, 50.9% were married couples living together, 19.2% had a female householder with no husband present, and 27.1% were non-families. 25.7% of all households were made up of individuals, and 14.5% had someone living alone who was 65 years of age or older. The average household size was 2.63 and the average family size was 3.19.

In the town, the population was spread out, with 8.4% under the age of 18, 11.5% from 18 to 24, 53.2% from 25 to 44, 20.7% from 45 to 64, and 6.3% who were 65 years of age or older. The median age was 36 years. For every 100 females, there were 434.8 males. For every 100 females age 18 and over, there were 542.3 males.

The median income for a household in the town was $32,639, and the median income for a family was $42,188. Males had a median income of $22,500 versus $22,404 for females. The per capita income for the town was $9,186. About 13.6% of families and 18.9% of the population were below the poverty line, including 27.8% of those under age 18 and 21.1% of those age 65 or over.

Government and infrastructure
The South Carolina Department of Corrections operates the Lieber Correctional Institution in Ridgeville.

References

Towns in Dorchester County, South Carolina
Towns in South Carolina
Charleston–North Charleston–Summerville metropolitan area